is a Japanese manga artist. She is best known as the creator of the manga series Kids on the Slope, for which she won a Shogakukan Manga Award in 2011.

Biography
Kodama was born on September 26 in Sasebo, Nagasaki Prefecture, Japan. She made her debut as a manga artist in 2000, with her series  published in Cutie Comic, a manga magazine published by Takarajimasha. Kodama would go on to publish several short-form works in Cutie Comic and Vanilla, a manga magazine published by Kodansha, in the early- to mid-2000s.

Kodama is best known for her manga series Kids on the Slope, which was serialized in the manga magazine Monthly Flowers from 2007 to 2012. The series, which Kodama based on her own experience growing up in Sasebo, was the top-ranked manga for women in the 2009 edition of Takarajimasha's annual Kono Manga ga Sugoi! rankings and won the 57th Shogakukan Manga Award in 2012 for general manga. In 2012, Kids on the Slope was adapted into a television anime series by director Shinichirō Watanabe. 

Following Kids on the Slope, Kodama's wrote the manga series Tsukikage Baby, a drama focused on events in a traditional Japanese town from the perspectives of several different families. The series, which was published from 2013 to 2017 in Monthly Flowers; was one of the top ranked manga for women in the 2014 Kono Manga ga Sugoi! rankings. Her next series Chiisako no Niwa, also published in Monthly Flowers, ran from 2017 to 2018, and placed eighth in the 2019 Kono Manga ga Sugoi! rankings. Her most recent work, Ao no Hana, Utsuwa no Mori, has been published in Monthly Flowers since 2018.

Works

Ongoing series
Hagoromo Mishin (published in Monthly Flowers, 2007)
Kids on the Slope (published in Monthly Flowers, 2007 – 2012)
Tsukikage Baby (published in Monthly Flowers, 2013 – 2017)
Chiisako no Niwa (published in Monthly Flowers, 2017 – 2018)
Ao no Hana, Utsuwa no Mori (published in Monthly Flowers, 2018 – present)

One-Shots
Zakuro (published in Cutie Comic, 2000)
Hōsekibako no Ningyo (published in Yawaraka Spirits, 2013)
Underground (published in Zōkan Flowers, 2014)

Awards

|-
! rowspan="1" | 2009
| Kids on the Slope
| Female Readers
| Kono Manga ga Sugoi!
| 
| 
| 
|-
! rowspan="1" | 2011
| Kids on the Slope
| General
| Shogakukan Manga Award
| 
| 
| 
|-
! rowspan="1" | 2014
| Tsukikage Baby
| Female Readers
| Kono Manga ga Sugoi!
| 
| 
| 
|-
! rowspan="1" | 2019
| Chiisako no Niwa
| Female Readers
| Kono Manga ga Sugoi!
| 
| 
|

References

External links
 Official website (defunct; link via Internet Archive)
Yuki Kodama at Shogakukan
 Yuki Kodama on Twitter

Year of birth missing (living people)
Women manga artists
Manga artists from Tokyo
Manga artists from Nagasaki Prefecture
Winners of the Shogakukan Manga Award for general manga
Japanese female comics artists
Living people
Female comics writers